Interstate 14 (I-14), also known as the 14th Amendment Highway, the Gulf Coast Strategic Highway, and the Central Texas Corridor, is an Interstate Highway that is located entirely in Central Texas, following US Highway 190 (US 190). The portion of the route that has been constructed and signed to date, the Central Texas Corridor along US 190 west of I-35 was officially designated as I-14 by the Fixing America's Surface Transportation Act (FAST Act), signed by President Barack Obama on December 14, 2015.

The proposal for the "14th Amendment Highway" has its origins in the 2005 transportation bill, the Safe, Accountable, Flexible, Efficient Transportation Equity Act: A Legacy for Users (SAFETEA-LU). The route was initially planned to have a western terminus at Natchez, Mississippi (later from I-49 near Alexandria, Louisiana), extending east through Louisiana, Mississippi, and Alabama, before ending at Augusta, Georgia, or North Augusta, South Carolina. Advocates of the Gulf Coast Strategic Highway subsequently proposed extending I-14 to I-10 near Fort Stockton and the junction of US 277 and I-10 near Sonora, Texas. The study and planning of I-14 has continued because of support and interest from both Congress and the associated state highway departments. The I-14 corridor, if ultimately constructed, would provide a national strategic link to numerous major military bases and major Gulf and Atlantic coasts ports used for overseas deployments in six states from Texas to South Carolina.

On November 15, 2021, President Joe Biden signed the Infrastructure Investment and Jobs Act (IIJA), which designated the components of the Gulf Coast Strategic Highway corridor between Brady, Texas (including forks to I-20 in Midland and I-10 in Pecos County, Texas), and Augusta, Georgia, as High Priority Corridors of the National Highway System, forming a future extension of I-14.

History
The highway was proposed in 2005 as the "14th Amendment Highway" without an official Interstate Highway designation, with a western terminus at Natchez, Mississippi, extending east through the states of Mississippi and Alabama, before ending at Augusta, Georgia. The highway was named in honor of the Fourteenth Amendment, as the route would traverse the southern "Black Belt" region that formed the heart of the slave-based plantation economy of the 19th century.

US Representative Charlie Norwood of Georgia suggested the highway could be extended to Austin, Texas, in the west and Grand Strand, South Carolina, in the east. SAFETEA-LU was signed into law by President George W. Bush on August 10, 2005. Congressional advocacy for the legislation spiked following the post-Hurricane Katrina logistics controversies. The act included the 14th Amendment Highway and the 3rd Infantry Division Highway (I-3). The legislation did not provide funding for either highway. The Federal Highway Administration (FHWA) has no funding identified beyond the Phase II studies to support long-range planning, environmental review, or construction which must be initiated at the state or regional level with any further direction from Congress. The western terminus was later changed to I-49 near Alexandria, Louisiana.

The 14th Amendment Highway and the Gulf Coast Strategic Highway concepts continued through active studies to the present as local and state interest began to surface and support in Congress, the FHWA, and, most importantly, in the associated state highway departments, all the key ingredients necessary to successfully justify funding any proposed federal-aid highway project. The FHWA issued its report on the 14th Amendment Highway to Congress in 2011 and made recommendation for further environmental and feasibility substudies; however, little action to fund these studies advanced in Congress after 2011. The Texas Department of Transportation (TxDOT) also conducted the US 190/IH-10 Feasibility Study in 2011, which concluded that it was justified to upgrade US 190 to a divided four-lane arterial highway based on traffic projections to 2040, but that upgrading US 190 to a full freeway through Texas was only justified if the 14th Amendment Highway is actually constructed from Louisiana to Georgia.

The I-14 concept became a reality when House Committee on Transportation and Infrastructure  members Brian Babin and Blake Farenthold authored and introduced the amendment to the 2015 FAST Act that created I-14 that generally follows US 190 in Texas. US Senator John Cornyn of Texas sponsored the amendment in the US Senate. The official Future I-14 designation was approved when the FAST Act was signed into law on December 4, 2015, by President Obama.

TxDOT is moving forward with designating I-14 along US 190 from Copperas Cove to I-35 in Belton. The American Association of State Highway and Transportation Officials (AASHTO) originally denied approval of TxDOT's request for the number at their May 24, 2016, meeting of the Special Committee on US Route Numbering, the body responsible for approving designations in the US Numbered and Interstate highway systems. The FHWA and AASHTO subsequently approved the I-14 designation. The Texas Transportation Commission made the I-14 number official on January 26, 2017. The official signage ceremony was held April 22, 2017, in Killeen, Texas, on the Central Texas College campus. More I-14 signs went up over the next few weeks.

On April 11, 2019, US Representative Babin introduced the I-14 'Forts-to-Ports' bill—which could extend I-14 to Odessa—to the US House of Representatives.

In August 2021, senators Ted Cruz of Texas and Raphael Warnock of Georgia introduced an amendment to the American Jobs Plan that would designate a corridor of I-14 to connect their respective states. The Interstate as envisioned would reach from the Midland–Odessa, Texas, metropolitan area in the west to Augusta, Georgia, in the east. The bipartisan legislation aims to connect multiple military installations, including Fort Hood in Killeen, Texas (already connected); Goodfellow Air Force Base in San Angelo, Texas; Fort Polk in Leesville, Louisiana; Camp Beauregard in Pineville, Louisiana; Fort Benning in Columbus, Georgia; Robins Air Force Base in Warner Robins, Georgia; and Fort Gordon west of Augusta, Georgia. This amendment was included in the final bill approved by the House and Senate and signed by President Joe Biden on November 15, 2021.

Future

Existing route 
I-14 has been expanded from four to six lanes in Killeen, Texas, during a widening project that lasted from 2013 to late 2016. The project was estimated to be completed in 2014 but was delayed by other road expansion projects. Plans to widen the existing route through Harker Heights to the I-35 intersection in Belton from four lanes to six lanes began in April 2018 and are ongoing.

Proposed extension 
The IIJA designates an extended future I-14 corridor that would encompass the original "14th Amendment Highway" and "Gulf Coast Strategic Highway" concepts, including the following designated High Priority Corridors:

 High Priority Corridor 84, the Central Texas Corridor, including:
84(A): Commencing near State Highway Loop 338 (Loop 338) in Odessa, running eastward generally following I-20, connecting to State Highway 158 (SH 158) near Midland, then following SH 158 eastward before following US 87 southeastward, passing San Angelo, and connecting to US 190 near Brady. This proposed route has been designated "I-14 North".
84(B): Commencing at the intersection of I-10 and US 190 in Pecos County, following US 190 to Brady. This southern fork has been designated "I-14 South".
84(C): Following portions of US 190 eastward, passing near the central Texas cities of Fort Hood, Killeen, Belton, Temple, Bryan, College Station, Huntsville, Livingston, Woodville, and Jasper before connecting to SH 63 at the Burr's Ferry Bridge where it becomes Louisiana Highway 8 (LA 8) at the Louisiana border. This route includes a loop generally encircling Bryan–College Station, Texas designated "I-214".
84(D): Following US 83 southward from the vicinity of Eden to I-10 at Junction.
84(E): Following US 69 from I-10 in Beaumont north to US 190 near Woodville.
84(F): Following US 96 from I-10 in Beaumont north to US 190 near Jasper.
84(G): Following US 190, Farm to Market Road 305, and US 385 from I-10 in Pecos County to I-20 at Odessa.
 High Priority Corridor 99, the Central Louisiana Corridor, commencing at the Sabine River bridge where SH 63 becomes LA 8 before following portions of LA 8 to Leesville, then eastward on LA 28, passing near Alexandria, Pineville, Walters, and Archie, to US 84 and US 425 at the Natchez–Vidalia Bridge at Vidalia.
 High Priority Corridor 100, the Central Mississippi Corridor, including:
100(A): Commencing at the Natchez–Vidalia Bridge at the Mississippi River and then generally following portions of US 84 passing in the vicinity of Natchez, Brookhaven, Monticello, Prentiss, and Collins, to I-59 near Laurel, and continuing on I-59 north to I-20 before joining I-59 and I-20 to the Alabama state line. 
100(B): Commencing near Laurel, running south on I-59 to US 98 near Hattiesburg, connecting to US 49 south then following US 49 south to I-10 in the vicinity of Gulfport and following Mississippi Highway 601 south until the Mississippi State Port at Gulfport. 
 High Priority Corridor 101, the Middle Alabama Corridor, including:
101(A): Beginning at the Alabama–Mississippi border generally following portions of I-20 until following a new Interstate extension paralleling US 80.
101(B): Crossing State Route 28 (SR 28) near Coatopa, traveling eastward crossing US 43 and SR 69 near Selma, traveling eastward closely paralleling US 80 to the south before crossing SR 22, SR 41, and SR 21, until its intersection with I-65 near Hope Hull.
101(C): Continuing east along the proposed Montgomery Outer Loop (I-85) south of Montgomery, where it would next join with I-85 east of Montgomery.
101(D): Continuing along I-85 east bound until its intersection with US 280 near Opelika or US 80 near Tuskegee.
101(E): Generally following the most expedient route until intersecting with existing US 80 (J. R. Allen Parkway) through Phenix City until continuing into Columbus, Georgia.
 High Priority Corridor 102, the Middle Georgia Corridor, including: 
102(A): Beginning at the Alabama–Georgia state line generally following the Fall Line Freeway from Columbus to Augusta.
102(B): Traveling along US 80 (J. R. Allen Parkway) through Columbus and near Fort Benning east to Talbot County, where it would follow State Route 96 (SR 96), then commencing on SR 49C (Fort Valley Bypass) to SR 49 (Peach Parkway) to its intersection with I-75 in Byron.
102(C): Continuing north along I-75 through Warner Robins and Macon, where it would meet I-16, then following I-16 east it would next join US 80 and SR 57 east of Macon.
102(D): Commencing with SR 57 which turns into SR 24 near Milledgeville would then bypass Wrens with a newly constructed bypass before joining US 1 near Fort Gordon into Augusta, where I-14 will terminate at an interchange of I-20 and I-520.

Exit list
Exit numbers follow US 190's mile markers.

Auxiliary route

I-14 in Texas is proposed to have one auxiliary route, Interstate 214 (I-214), which would serve as a loop for Bryan–College Station.

See also

Fall Line Freeway, a highway proposed to be the Georgia portion of I-14

Notes

References

External links

 2005 SAFETEA-LU legislation, from the Library of Congress 
 Interstate 14 @ InterstateGuide.Com

Fourteenth Amendment to the United States Constitution
Interstate 14
14
14
Transportation in Coryell County, Texas
Transportation in Bell County, Texas